The Peleduy is a river in Yakutia (Sakha Republic), Russia.

The river flows across a largely desolate area. Tolon village is located by the river in its middle course and the settlement of Peleduy is located by the Peleduy at the confluence with the Lena. There is rock salt mining and wood processing in the basin of the river. At Peleduy there is a shipping yard for shipbuilding, maintenance and overhaul.

History
In 2006 the Talakan - Vitim oil pipeline burst in two places.

Course  
The Peleduy is a left tributary of the Lena. It has its sources in the southwestern area of the Lena Plateau. The river flows in a roughly southeastern direction among large boulders within a fairly straight channel. In its middle reaches it bends northeastwards within a floodplain and not far south of the course of the Nyuya it bends southeastwards again. Finally it meets the left bank of the Lena by Peleduy village  from its mouth.

Tributaries
The largest tributaries of the Peleduy are the Mulisma and Kodardakh from the right and the Delinda, Gadala, Kurchakh, Karam and Khoron from the left. The river freezes between October and May. Permafrost is prevalent in the river basin.

Flora and fauna
The vegetation of the Peleduy basin is mainly pine and larch taiga, with yearly snow cover between October and April in the area.

The main fish species in the river are dace, pike, roach, perch, ide, valyok, tugun, bream and grayling.

See also
List of rivers of Russia

References

External links 

Beastly bacteria on extinct ancient carcasses offers 'cure' for modern oil pollution

Rivers of the Sakha Republic